Daniel Roland Lanois  (born September 19, 1951) is a Canadian record producer, guitarist, vocalist, and songwriter.

He has produced albums by artists including Bob Dylan, Neil Young, Peter Gabriel, Robbie Robertson, Emmylou Harris, Willie Nelson, Spoons, and Brandon Flowers. He collaborated with Brian Eno to produce several albums for U2, including The Joshua Tree (1987) and Achtung Baby (1991). Three albums produced or co-produced by Lanois have won the Grammy Award for Album of the Year. Four other albums received Grammy nominations.

Lanois has released several solo albums. He wrote and performed the music for the 1996 film Sling Blade.

Biography

Early life and career
Lanois was born in Hull, Quebec. Lanois started his production career when he was 17, recording local artists including Simply Saucer with his brother Bob Lanois in a studio in the basement of their mother's home in Ancaster, Ontario. Later, Lanois started Grant Avenue Studios in an old house which he purchased in Hamilton, Ontario. He worked with a number of local bands, including Martha and the Muffins (for whom his sister Jocelyne played bass), Ray Materick, Spoons, and the Canadian children's singer Raffi. Lanois attended Ancaster High School.

Producer 
In 1981, Lanois played on and produced the album This Is the Ice Age by Martha and the Muffins. In 1985, he and two members of the band earned a CASBY award for their work on the band's (by then going by "M + M") 1984 album Mystery Walk.

Lanois worked collaboratively with Brian Eno on some of Eno's own projects, one of which was the "Prophecy Theme" for David Lynch's film adaptation of Frank Herbert's Dune. Eno invited him to co-produce U2's album The Unforgettable Fire.  Along with Eno, he went on to produce U2's The Joshua Tree, the 1987 Grammy Award for Album of the Year winner, and some of the band's other works including Achtung Baby and All That You Can't Leave Behind, both of which were nominated for the same award but did not win. Lanois once again collaborated with U2 and Brian Eno on the band's 2009 album, No Line on the Horizon. He was involved in the songwriting process as well as mixing and production.

Lanois' early work with U2 led to him being hired to produce albums for other top-selling artists. He collaborated with Peter Gabriel on his album Birdy (1985), the soundtrack to Alan Parker's film of the same name, and then spent most of 1985 co-producing Gabriel's album So. The album was released in 1986 and became his best-selling release, earning multi-platinum sales and a Grammy nomination for Album of the Year. Lanois later co-produced Gabriel's follow-up, Us which was released in 1992 and also went platinum.

Bono recommended Lanois to Bob Dylan in the late 1980s; in 1989, Lanois produced Dylan's Oh Mercy. Eight years later, Dylan and Lanois worked together on Time Out of Mind, which won another Grammy Award for Album of the Year in 1997. In his autobiographical Chronicles, Vol. 1, Dylan describes in depth the contentious but rewarding working relationship he developed with Lanois.

Wrecking Ball, his 1995 collaboration with Emmylou Harris, won a 1996 Grammy Award for Best Contemporary Folk Album. In 1998, he produced and appeared on Willie Nelson's album Teatro.

Lanois was working on Neil Young's record Le Noise in June 2010 when he was hospitalized after suffering multiple injuries in a motorcycle crash in the Silver Lake area of Los Angeles.
He has since recovered. 

Lanois' production is recognizable and notable for its 'big' and 'live' drum sound, atmospheric guitars and ambient reverb. Rolling Stone called Lanois the "most important record producer to emerge in the Eighties."

Recording artist 
As well as being a producer, Lanois is a songwriter, musician and recording artist. He has released several solo albums and film scores; his first album, Acadie was released in 1989. A number of Lanois' songs have been covered by other artists, including Dave Matthews, Jerry Garcia Band, Willie Nelson, Tea Party, Anna Beljin, Isabelle Boulay, and Emmylou Harris. His albums have had some success, particularly in Canada. Lanois plays the guitar, pedal steel, and drums. Belladonna, an instrumental album released in 2005 was nominated for a Grammy.

Lanois' song "Sonho Dourado" was included in the 2004 Billy Bob Thornton film, Friday Night Lights. In 2005 with the re-release of his first solo album, Acadie, a late-1980s version of the song appears on the additional tracks called "Early Dourado Sketch". Lanois had performed the song numerous times in the intervening years, including on a Toronto television program in 1993 where it was credited as "Irish Melody" on a recording of the performance. Though the melody does indeed feel Irish, the title is Portuguese and means golden dream.
Lanois also provided an instrumental score for LOUDquietLOUD, a 2006 documentary about the Pixies.

Lanois premiered a documentary entitled Here Is What Is at the Toronto International Film Festival in 2007. The film chronicles the recording of his album of the same name and includes footage of the actual recording. The album Here Is What Is was released, first by download, then on compact disc, in late 2007 and early 2008. Soon after that, Lanois released a three-disc recording called Omni.

In October 2009, Lanois started a project called Black Dub which features Lanois on guitar, Brian Blade on drums, and Daryl Johnson on bass, along with multi-instrumentalist/singer Trixie Whitley. They released a self-titled album in 2010. In 2014, Lanois played with Emmylou Harris as a sideman and opening act on a tour focused on the Wrecking Ball material he produced.

Solo career
On October 28, 2014, Lanois released an album titled Flesh and Machine on ANTI- Records, based on Brian Eno's ambient albums. The  instrumental album consists primarily of original atmospheric and process-based sounds, blending pedal steel guitar and a variety of digital and analog sound processing devices. He was assisted by the drummer Brian Blade. In 2016, he released the album Goodbye to Language with Rocco Deluca.

The collaborative album Venetian Snares x Daniel Lanois was released on Venetian Snares' label Timesig in May 2018.

Lanois also contributed to the composition and production of the soundtrack for the 2018 video game Red Dead Redemption 2, released by Rockstar Games. He was given seven composition credits, including one for the song "Table Top".

Awards
Lanois was invested in the Order of Canada in 2018.
Lanois won a Juno Award in 1990 as most promising artist.
Lanois has received seven Grammy Awards for his work with various artists, including Bob Dylan, U2, Emmylou Harris and Neil Young.
 In 2005, he was inducted into Canada's Walk of Fame. In June 2013, he received a lifetime achievement award at the Governor General's Performing Arts Awards.

Discography

Albums

Soundtracks 
 Trip: Soundtrack Collection (self-released, 1993) – compilation
 Sweet Angel Mine (1996)
 Lost in Mississippi (1996)
 Sling Blade (1996)
 Red Dead Redemption 2 (2018) – game

Videography

Production credits

Collaborations 
 Peter Gabriel, So (Charisma, 1986)
 Robbie Robertson, Robbie Robertson (1987)
 Bob Dylan, Oh Mercy (1989)
 Peter Gabriel, Us (1992)
 Emmylou Harris, Wrecking Ball (1995)
 Ron Sexsmith, Ron Sexsmith (1995)
 Bob Dylan, Time Out of Mind (1997)
 Gordon Lightfoot, A Painter Passing Through (1998)
 Natalie Merchant, Ophelia (1998)
 Joe Henry, Fuse (1999)
 Peter Gabriel, Up (2002)
 Solomon Burke, Don't Give Up on Me (2002)
 Emmylou Harris, Stumble into Grace (2003)
 Brandon Flowers, Flamingo (2010)
 Leonard Cohen, Thanks for the Dance (2019)
 Annie Barbazza, Vive (2020)

See also

 Canadian Music Hall of Fame
 List of ambient music artists
 Music of Canada

References

External links

 
 Entry at discogs.com
 

1951 births
Canadian folk singer-songwriters
Canadian rock singers
Canadian folk guitarists
Canadian male guitarists
Canadian rock guitarists
Canadian ambient musicians
Canadian male singer-songwriters
Canadian record producers
Canadian Music Hall of Fame inductees
Musicians from Gatineau
Musicians from Hamilton, Ontario
French Quebecers
Canadian people of Acadian descent
Living people
Canadian audio engineers
Pedal steel guitarists
Juno Award for Instrumental Album of the Year winners
Grammy Award winners
All Saints Records artists
Governor General's Performing Arts Award winners
Warner Records artists
Juno Award for Breakthrough Artist of the Year winners
Jack Richardson Producer of the Year Award winners
Anti- (record label) artists